Ndiole Sène (born 7 February 2003) is a Senegalese handball player for Espoir du Walo and the Senegalese national team. 

She competed at the 2019 World Women's Handball Championship in Japan.

References

2003 births
Living people
Senegalese female handball players
21st-century Senegalese women